Lisboa Island is the southwesternmost of the small islands off the south end of Petermann Island, in the Wilhelm Archipelago, Antarctica. It was discovered and named by the French Antarctic Expedition, 1908–10, under Jean-Baptiste Charcot.

See also 
 List of Antarctic and sub-Antarctic islands

References

Islands of the Wilhelm Archipelago